Carolina blue (occasionally referred to as Tar Heel blue) is the shade of blue used as one of the official school colors of the University of North Carolina. The name is derived from the popular usage of "Carolina" to refer to the university. For clarity in branding and marketing, UNC Creative has defined the color as Pantone 542 and declared that the CMYK representation is Cyan 60%, Magenta 19%, Yellow 1%, and Black 4%.

The North Carolina Tar Heels athletics department has their own formulation for Carolina blue. Carolina athletics blue has the same CMYK color representation as the university's version of Carolina blue, but the RGB representation for Carolina athletics blue is Red 123, Green 175, and Blue 212.

Use of the light blue color at UNC dates from 1795 when the Dialectic (blue) and Philanthropic (white) Societies of the university chose representative colors. Society members would wear a blue or white ribbon at university functions, and blue or white ribbons were attached to the diplomas of graduates. Light blue and white have been UNC's sporting colors since the 1880s, when UNC's football team adopted the light blue and white of the Di-Phi Societies as their colors.

References 

North Carolina Tar Heels
University of North Carolina at Chapel Hill traditions
Shades of blue
School colors